The 1932–33 season was Chelsea Football Club's twenty-fourth competitive season. Chelsea finished 18th in the First Division and were knocked out in the third round of the FA Cup. David Calderhead, who had been Chelsea's secretary-manager for 26 years, retired at the end of the season.

Table

References

External links
 1932–33 season at stamford-bridge.com

1932–33
English football clubs 1932–33 season